The Romanian diaspora is the ethnically Romanian population outside Romania and Moldova. The concept does not usually include the ethnic Romanians who live as natives in nearby states, chiefly those Romanians who live in Ukraine, Hungary, Serbia, and Bulgaria. Therefore, the number of all Romanians abroad is estimated at about 4–12 million people, depending on one's definition of the term "Romanian" as well as the inclusion respectively exclusion of ethnic Romanians living in nearby countries where they are indigenous. The definition of "who is a Romanian?" may range from rigorous conservative estimates based on self-identification and official statistics to estimates that include people of Romanian ancestry born in their respective countries as well as people born to various ethnic-minorities from Romania.

In 2006, the Romanian diaspora was estimated at about 8 million people by then President of Romania, Traian Băsescu, most of them living in the former USSR, Western Europe (esp. Italy, Spain, Germany, United Kingdom, France, and Austria), North America (Canada and the United States), South America, and Australia. Nonetheless, it is unclear if Băsescu included the indigenous Romanians living in the immediate surroundings of the Romanian state, which are those in Moldova, Bulgaria, Hungary, Serbia and Ukraine.

In December 2013, Cristian David, the government minister for the Department for Romanians Everywhere, declared that a new reality illustrates that between 6–8 million Romanians live outside Romania's borders. This includes 2–3 million indigenous Romanians living in neighbouring states such as Ukraine, Hungary, Serbia, Bulgaria, the Balkans and especially the Republic of Moldova. The number also includes circa 2.7–3.5 million Romanians in Western Europe.

Furthermore, the Romanian diaspora emerged as a powerful political force in elections since 2009. For the 2014 presidential election, voting in the diaspora was poorly organized and resulted in protests in several major European cities. The diaspora vote played a key role in the final result. 5 years later, in the 2019 presidential election, then center-right candidate and incumbent President Klaus Iohannis was once again overwhelmingly voted by the Romanian diaspora from all over the world.

Below is a list of self-declared ethnic Romanians in the countries where they live, excluding those who live in Romania and Moldova but including those who live in Ukraine, Serbia, Hungary, and Bulgaria.

The numbers are based on official statistical data in the respective states where such Romanians reside or – wherever such data is unavailable – based on official estimates made by the Romanian department for Romanians abroad (figures for Spain, Italy, Germany, the United Kingdom, France, Sweden, Portugal, and Turkey are for Romanian citizens, and may include individuals of any ethnicity).

Ethnic Romanians are primarily present in Europe and North America. However, there are ethnic Romanians in Turkey, both in the Asian and European parts of the country, descendants of Wallachian settlers invited by the Ottoman Empire from the early fourteenth to the late nineteenth centuries. Furthermore, there are about 2,000 Romanian immigrants in Japan since the late twentieth century.

Distribution by country

See also
 Aromanian diaspora
 Moldovan diaspora

References

External links

 
European diasporas